The South Korean boy band Shinhwa has released fifteen studio albums, three live albums, five compilation albums, one box set, three EPs, thirty-four singles, and sixteen contributions to multi-artist compilations. Shinhwa was created by SM Entertainment and debuted in 1998 with the album Resolver. Under SM Entertainment, Shinhwa released six full-length studio albums and contributed to numerous SM Town compilation albums featuring other SM artists. Sixteen promotional, not-for-sale singles were also released. One greatest hits compilation, My Choice, was released by SM Entertainment in 2002 in South Korea.

After expiration of their contract with SM Entertainment in 2002, Shinhwa moved to Good EMG. Following discussions and compromises regarding the group's right to continued use of their name and to perform the music and choreography created while at SM, Shinhwa released their first album under Good EMG, titled Winter Story, in late 2003. Winter Story was the first of two albums and two EPs Shinhwa would eventually release with "Winter Story" in the titles. The albums are considered "special releases" and are usually not counted when assigning ordinals to Shinhwa's studio album releases in the media and by the group itself. Thus, it was Shinhwa's next album release, Brand New in 2004, that was publicized as their seventh album, though technically it was their eighth. The success of Brand New brought the group two prestigious daesang (grand prize) awards for the year 2004, a first for the group. Shinhwa went on to release a total of eight albums and EPs under Good EMG, plus thirteen promotional singles. In 2006, they contracted with Nippon Columbia to release an album, Inspiration #1 and single "We Have the Sun in Our Hearts" (僕らの心には太陽がある) targeted for the Japanese market. Shinhwa's first six Korean albums were released to the Japanese market in 2001 to 2003, and Avex Trax released three Korean-language greatest hits compilations in Japan and one in Taiwan.

2008 signaled the beginning of a four-year hiatus of Shinhwa's group activities, as five of the six members were required to fulfill their mandatory national military service. During the inactive period, Pony Canyon released a multi-disc box set collection of Shinhwa's Korean albums in Japan in 2009. In August 2011, in preparation for their post-military return to the music industry, Shinhwa established Shinhwa Company (briefly renamed ShinCom Entertainment during a copyright lawsuit), a joint venture to oversee Shinhwa's group activities. Since 2012, Shinhwa have released three full-length albums and four promotional singles, distributed through CJ E&M Music. They are one of the only Korean pop artists currently who continue to release full-length albums instead of a multitude of EPs and maxi-singles. They are also considered the longest-running idol group in Korea, having existed for 22 years with no changes in member lineup.

Albums

Studio albums

Live albums

Compilation albums

Box sets

Extended plays

Singles

Other charted songs

Other appearances

Notes
 A  The Recording Industry Association of Korea (RIAK) tracked physical album, EP, and singles sales and released a consolidated sales and ranking chart monthly from January 1999 to September 2008. It did not track digital-only sales.
 B  The Gaon Music Chart began releasing data in 2010 after the Recording Industry Association of Korea stopped compiling data in October 2008. Charts are released weekly, monthly, and yearly. Chart positions listed in this article are weekly rankings, unless otherwise noted. Online sources for charts released after September 2008 and before January 2010 are currently unavailable.
 C  There are no publicly available records for Japan's Oricon chart prior to mid-2005.
 D  The Billboard Korea K-Pop Hot 100 charted sales in Korea from August 25, 2011 to May 17, 2014.
 E  Shinhwa's Japanese single, "We've Got the Sun in Our Hearts", was released in Korea as "우리들의 마음에는 태양이 있어" on September 6, 2006 and was tracked on the RIAK's "pop" chart for foreign music releases. The chart for the month of September 2006 was never successfully archived, and thus the probable chart peak for the single is unavailable. The highest verifiable chart position is number 7 for the following month of October 2006. The single sold 15,052 copies in its debut month (17,316 total sales through October minus 2,264 sales in October).
 F  These songs, originally titled in Korean (or Japanese), have no official English titles. Therefore, the translations provided here may differ from those in other sources.

Footnotes

References

External links
 Shincom Entertainment Official Homepage 

discography
Discographies of South Korean artists
K-pop music group discographies